Florian Livadaru (born 18 November 1955) is a Romanian boxer. He competed in the men's lightweight event at the 1980 Summer Olympics. He won the Romanian National Amateur Boxing Championship at the lightweight division in 1975.

References

External links
1976 Romanian National Championships
1980 Romanian National Championships

1955 births
Living people
Romanian male boxers
Olympic boxers of Romania
Boxers at the 1980 Summer Olympics
Place of birth missing (living people)
Lightweight boxers